The Accounting, Auditing & Accountability Journal is a peer-reviewed academic journal covering accounting theory and practice. The journal was established in 1988 and is published by Emerald Group Publishing. 

In 2022 the editors-in-chief are James Guthrie (Macquarie University) and Lee D. Parker (Glasgow University and RMIT University. The journal publishes papers on "the interaction between accounting and auditing on the one hand and their institutional, socio-economic, political, and historical environment on the other", as well as poetry and short prose from accounting and management academics. The journal sponsors the Asia-Pacific Interdisciplinary Research Conference in Accounting, which is held every three years.

Abstracting and indexing
The journal is abstracted and indexed in:

According to the Journal Citation Reports, the journal has a 2020 impact factor of 4.117.

Notable articles
According to Google Scholar, the most cited articles are:

References

External links
 

Accounting journals
Publications established in 1988
English-language journals
Emerald Group Publishing academic journals
8 times per year journals